Executive Order 8802 was signed by President Franklin D. Roosevelt on June 25, 1941, to prohibit ethnic or racial discrimination in the nation's defense industry. It also set up the Fair Employment Practice Committee.  It was the first federal action, though not a law, to promote equal opportunity and prohibit employment discrimination in the United States. Many citizens of Italian or German ethnicity were affected by World War II and this was impeding the war effort and lowering morale. This ethnic factor was a major motivation for Roosevelt.  The President's statement that accompanied the Order cited the war effort, saying that "the democratic way of life within the nation can be defended successfully only with the help and support of all groups," and cited reports of discrimination:

The executive order had also been demanded by civil rights activists A. Philip Randolph, Walter White, and others involved in the March on Washington Movement who had planned a march on Washington, D.C. on July 1, 1941 to protest racial discrimination in industry and the military. With the march date approaching, President Roosevelt enlisted New Dealer Aubrey Williams and labor expert Anna M. Rosenberg to work with Randolph and White to create an Executive Order that would satisfy both sides. A series of meetings in New York and Washington with Williams, Rosenberg, New York Mayor Fiorello La Guardia, Randolph and White resulted in the draft order. The March on Washington was suspended after Executive Order 8802 was issued on June 25, 1941.

The order required federal agencies and departments involved with defense production to ensure that vocational and training programs were administered without discrimination as to "race, creed, color, or national origin."  All defense contracts were to include provisions that barred private contractors from discrimination as well.

History

The Order established the President's Committee on Fair Employment Practice within the Office of Production Management, which was to centralize government contracting in the defense buildup before the United States entered World War II. The FEPC was to educate industry as to requirements, investigate alleged violations and "shall take appropriate steps to redress grievances which it finds to be valid." The Committee was also supposed to make recommendations to federal agencies and to the President on how Executive Order 8802 could be made most effective.

The preamble to the Order read:
Whereas it is the policy of the United States to encourage full participation in the national defense program by all citizens of the United States, regardless of race, creed, color, or national origin, in the firm belief that the democratic way of life within the Nation can be defended successfully only with the help and support of all groups within its borders; and

Whereas there is evidence that available and needed workers have been barred from employment in industries engaged in defense production solely because of consideration of race, creed, color, or national origin, to the detriment of workers' morale and of national unity:

Now, Therefore, by virtue of the authority vested in me by the Constitution and the statutes, and as a prerequisite to the successful conduct of our national defense production effort, I do hereby reaffirm the policy of the United States that there shall be no discrimination in the employment of workers in defense industries or government because of race, creed, color, or national origin, and I do hereby declare that it is the duty of employers and of labor organizations, in furtherance of said policy and of this Order, to provide for the full and equitable participation of all workers in defense industries, without discrimination because of race, creed, color, or national origin;

These statements were directed at abolishing discrimination in employment within the defense industry and government. The government did not end segregation in the armed forces until 1948, when President Harry S. Truman issued Executive Order 9981.

Executive Order 8802 was amended several times during the war years. After the US entered the war, the FEPC was placed under the War Production Board, established under E.O. 9040.

In May 1943, Executive Order 9346 was issued, expanding the coverage of the FEPC to federal agencies carrying out regular government programs and returning it to independent status. Following the end of World War II, the Committee was terminated by statute on July 17, 1945.
 
This EO was superseded by Executive Order 9981 in 1948. Years later congressional passage of Title VII of the 1964 Civil Rights Act and Executive Order 11246 in 1965 prohibited discrimination in employment and public facilities.

Impact on other races

Mexican Americans 
Mexican Americans faced discrimination in the workplace and public transportation, often being seen as no better than dogs. Executive Order 8802 outlawed discrimination in the defense industry based on “race, creed, color, or national origin”. Executive Order 8802, established the Fair Employment Practices Committee (FEPC). While it ensured African Americans could receive fair employment, it often failed to provide the same protections to Mexican Americans because of America’s foreign policy in regard to Latin American nations. For example, the FEPC was supposed to hold public hearings to discuss accusations of discrimination, however it often canceled the hearings at the last minute when a case involving accusations by Mexican Americans was on the docket, fearing public knowledge of mass discrimination would compromise the Good Neighbor Policy. Moreover, though workplace discrimination took place in the Bracero Program as well, concerns were ignored for similar reasons. Second generation Mexican Americans had a reputation for being more vocal in addressing workplace grievances and were more receptive to unionization as a solution for widespread discrimination.

See also
Committee on Fair Employment Practice
Executive Order 9981
Executive order (United States)

References

External links

Full text of Executive Order 8802

8802
History of civil rights in the United States
African-American history between emancipation and the civil rights movement
20th-century military history of the United States
1940 in American law
1941 in American politics